Damien Francis Smith is a New Zealand Member of Parliament for ACT New Zealand. He was first elected at the 2020 general election.

Early life and career 
Smith was born in Northern Ireland and grew up in Enniskillen during The Troubles. He came to New Zealand in 2002. He has worked for Virgin Group and ASB Bank, and runs his own consulting business.

Political career

During the 2020 New Zealand general election, Smith contested the Botany electorate for the ACT Party, occupying tenth place on their party list. Smith came third in Botany. He was elected to the New Zealand Parliament on the ACT Party list. Smith is ACT's spokesperson for Land Information, Commerce and Consumer Affairs, State Owned Enterprises, Revenue, Racing, Arts, Culture and Heritage, and Sport and Recreation, and associate spokesperson for Finance.

References 

Living people
21st-century New Zealand politicians
New Zealand list MPs
ACT New Zealand MPs
Members of the New Zealand House of Representatives
People from Enniskillen
Northern Ireland emigrants to New Zealand
Year of birth missing (living people)